Olga Govortsova and Tatiana Poutchek were the defending champions, but only Poutchek tries to defend the title.
She partnered with Alexandra Panova and they won this tournament, by defeating Alexandra Dulgheru and Magdaléna Rybáriková 6–3, 6–4 in the final.

Seeds

Draw

Draw

References
 Doubles Draw

Tashkent Open - Doubles
Tashkent Open